Tobias and the Angel is a theme in art taken from the Book of Tobit. It may refer to a number of works of art and music, including:
 The Archangel Raphael and Tobias, a c. 1465–1470 painting by Antonio and Piero del Pollaiuolo
 Tobias and the Angel (Verrocchio), a 1470–1475 painting attributed to the workshop of Andrea del Verrocchio
 Tobias and the Angel (Filippino Lippi), a c. 1475–1480 painting by Filippino Lippi
 Certosa di Pavia Altarpiece, a c. 1496–1500 altarpiece by Pietro Perugino
 The Archangel Raphael and Tobias (Titian), a c. 1512−1514 painting by Titian; also a c. 1540−1545 painting by him
 Landscape with Tobias and the Angel (Rosa), a c. 1670 painting by Salvator Rosa
 Tobias and the Angel (opera), a 1999 community opera by Jonathan Dove, with a libretto by David Lan